The Battle of the Saints is the annual cricket contest between St. Joseph's College and St Peter's College in Colombo, Sri Lanka, which typically takes place in March. Inaugurated in 1933 by the Rectors of St.Joseph's and St. Peter's, the matches receive significant media and supporter attention, with the 2016 match being the 82nd encounter. The teams compete for the Reverend Father Maurice Legoc Trophy, named after the tournament's founder. 
For the past 82 matches, St. Joseph’s college have recorded 12 wins, while the Peterites have registered 10. The rest of the matches have ended up as a draw with no wins for either team. In 2008 St. Joseph’s college won the match, which ended a 35-year drought, and in 2010 St. Peter’s won the match after 32 years. 
In the series the highest score is recorded by St Joseph’s college, which is 382, made back in 1982, led by Ken Serpanchy, while St. Peter’s college best being 345 for 9 in 1938 under Percy Perera.

The lowest score was recorded by St. Peter's College in 1972 when they were bowled out for just 36. St Joseph’s college recorded their lowest score of 56 in 1938.

In the limited overs encounter Joes have bowled the Peterites thrice for less than 100 and the Peterites are yet to bowl the Josephians out for less than 100.

In the 42nd Annual 50 overs encounter Peterite batsman Hashan Wanasekera played a match-winning knock of 118 runs that set a record stand of 152 runs for any wicket for the Bambalapitiya school erasing the previous best partnership of 143 runs between Angelo Perera and Chathura Peiris in 2009. His partner was Lakshina Rodrigo who made 61. 

The lowest total in the shorter format is also recorded by St. Peter's when they were bowled out for 58 runs in 2003 in response to St. Joseph's College score of 217, which incidentally is the highest winning margin.

In the longer version, Clive Inman of St. Peter's College holds the highest individual score which is 204 in 1954. Shenal Warnakula of St. Joseph's College holds the record as the most successful bowler in terms of wickets -taking 9 wickets for 41 in 1997.

Notable persons who have played
† Denotes player represented the National Team at Test Level
‡ Denotes player captained the national team (Test, ODI and/or T20I) and represented the National Team at Test Level
^ Denotes notable player that hasn't played international matches

Josephians
 Ashley de Silva†
 Ajith Weerakkody
 Roshan Abeysinghe^
 Chaminda Vaas‡
 Michael Vandort†
 Angelo Mathews‡
 Thisara Perera†
 Dimuth Karunaratne‡
 Roshen Silva†
 Sadeera Samarawickrama†

Peterites
 H I K Fernando^
 Roy Dias†
 David Heyn
 Clive Inman^
 Vinodhan John†
 Tony Opatha
 Rumesh Ratnayake†
 Amal Silva†
 Russell Arnold†
 Kaushal Lokuarachchi†
 Malinda Warnapura†
 Angelo Perera
 Andri Berenger
 Janith Liyanage

Match history

Limited Over history

Notes

External links
 St. Joseph's College Official Website
 St. Peter's College Official Website

Sri Lankan cricket in the 20th century
Sri Lankan cricket in the 21st century
Saints